Spilosoma pellucida is a moth of the family Erebidae. It was described by Walter Rothschild in 1910. It is found in Ghana.

Description

Male
Head and thorax ochreous with a fulvous tinge; antennae with the branches brown; abdomen pale yellow with a fulvous tinge. Forewing hyaline, the veins, costal and inner areas brownish ochreous; a small round black discoidal spot. Hindwing hyaline, the veins, costal and inner areas, and the termen ochreous.

Wingspan 38 mm.

References

Spilosoma pellucida at Markku Savela's Lepidoptera and Some Other Life Forms

Endemic fauna of Ghana
Moths described in 1910
pellucida
Insects of West Africa
Moths of Africa